Baba Fryo born Friday Igwe is a  veteran Nigerian  singer from Ajegunle. He is known for releasing street songs . His most popular song in Nigeria was titled "Dem go dey pose" which he released  in the late 1990s. The song was written in Nigerian Pidgin, to become popular with a  dancing style, known as Galala, invented by legendary Baba Fryo and his  Ajegunle music colleagues such as Daddy Fresh, Daddy Showkey.

Personal life 
Baba Fryo said in 2017 that he wished he married a woman who is also in the showbiz business.

He lamented that had he married a celebrity like himself, his career wouldn't have declined as it did because the wife would have raised his career as well. He however said much hard work has brought him back up on his 'feet'.

See also
 Daddy Showkey
 Daddy Fresh

References

20th-century Nigerian male singers
Living people
Year of birth missing (living people)